The North Shore is the general term for the northern suburbs of Montreal. The North Shore is located in southwestern Quebec on the northern shores of the Rivière des Prairies and the Rivière des Mille Îles, opposite the Island of Montreal and Île Jésus (the city of Laval). It consists of twenty municipalities that belong to the Laurentides and Lanaudière administrative regions. While the city of Laval is commonly associated with the North Shore, it is not considered part of the North Shore because of its status as an island.

Included Municipalities

Laurentians 

Blainville
Bois-des-Filion
Boisbriand
Deux-Montagnes
Lorraine
Mirabel
Oka
Pointe-Calumet
Rosemère
Saint-Eustache
Saint-Joseph-du-Lac
Sainte-Anne-des-Plaines
Sainte-Marthe-sur-le-Lac
Sainte-Thérèse

Lanaudière 

Charlemagne
L'Assomption
Mascouche
Repentigny
Saint-Sulpice
Terrebonne
Joliette

See also 

List of crossings of the Rivière des Prairies
List of crossings of the Rivière des Mille Îles
Off-island suburbs
South Shore (Montreal)
 Quebec Autoroute 13
 Quebec Autoroute 15
 Quebec Autoroute 19
 Quebec Autoroute 25
 Quebec Autoroute 640

Geography of Montreal
Greater Montreal